U.S. Route 121 (US 121) is a proposed U.S. highway designated as the Coalfields Expressway, a four-lane highway stretching from Beckley, West Virginia, to Pound, Virginia, approximately  in length. It is designed to connect Interstate 64 (I-64) and I-77 in West Virginia near Beckley to US 23 in Wise County, Virginia, at Pound.
While US 121 will not connect directly to US 21, it will intersect at the latter road's original alignment, now a part of I-77.

History
 The Coalfields Expressway will depart from US 23 in Pound, Virginia, in Wise County, and roughly follow Virginia State Route 83 (SR 83) in Buchanan County to West Virginia Route 83 (WV 83) in McDowell County, West Virginia. Then it will travel northeast through depressed areas of West Virginia, paralleling West Virginia Route 16 through Wyoming and Raleigh counties. It will then run toward an expanded Interstate 64/Interstate 77 interchange near Beckley. The roadways US 121 will replace are deficient in the fact that the existing roadways have limited passing opportunities, steep grades, and low design speeds. 

As of October 2020,  of US 121 is open to traffic in West Virginia (from the connector to WV 54 near Mullens and WV 16/WV 97 in Sophia) is currently signed as West Virginia Route 121 (WV 121).

Virginia
Near the Grundy - Vansant area, U.S. Route 460 will become a new four-lane highway connecting the Coalfields Expressway with Breaks Interstate Park at the Virginia / Kentucky border and Elkhorn City, Kentucky.

West Virginia

Construction started in 1999 with grading near Welch in western West Virginia. Work was completed in 2003.

Further eastward, work is continuing on a segment of the Expressway in the vicinity of Sophia and Crab Orchard near Beckley totaling . Grading and preliminary paving operations have been completed, as well as the gradings and bridge construction for a diamond interchange for West Virginia Route 54 and a bridge over West Virginia Route 16. In November 2004, a contract was awarded for paving operations at a cost of $11.5 million from Surveyor Creek Road to the West Virginia Route 16 interchange. With this segment of the Expressway completed, a new tie-in will be complete from Surveyor Creek Road to five-lane West Virginia Route 16, as well as an interchange with West Virginia Route 54.

Two contracts totaling $22.2 million are currently under construction.

In the fall of 2013, two contracts were awarded to grade and drain an additional  of US 121 near Helen. It is one of four projects planned to complete the road to Mullens.

Following the election of Governor Jim Justice in 2016, the newly elected Governor began aggressively pushing for the highway's completion. Governor Justice requested $54.4 million for grading in Wyoming County. The construction would be financed through raising taxes. In an upcoming ballot issue to approve of road bonds, Governor Justice allocated $55 million to extend the road from Slab Fork to Mullens and eventually to Welch. The ballot issue passed. On October 1, 2020, the extension to Mullens opened at a ceremony attended by Governor Justice.

Major intersections
Mileposts are approximate.

References

External links

 Official Virginia DOT Coalfields Expressway Web Site
 Official West Virginia DOT Coalfields Expressway Web Site. Coalfields Expressway Authority. June 20, 2003.
 Endpoints of U.S. Highway 121

21-1
21-1
21-1
21-1
1